Alfred Nehring (29 January 1845, in Gandersheim – 29 September 1904 in Berlin-Charlottenburg) was a German zoologist and paleontologist.

He studied philology and natural sciences in Göttingen and Halle, afterwards teaching classes in Wesel (1867) and Wolfenbüttel (1871). From 1881 he was a professor at the Landwirtschaftliche Hochschule (agricultural university) in Berlin.

Nehring's scientific investigations involved modern and prehistoric vertebrates, being particularly interested in the history and morphology of domesticated animals (horses, dogs, etc.). In his studies of the guinea pig, he asserted Cavia cutleri to be the direct ancestor of the domesticated guinea pig.

Selected writings 
 Ueber die Cerviden von Piracicaba in Brasilien (Prov. St. Paulo), 1884 - On cervids of Piracicaba.
 Ueber eine Pelzrobben-Art von der Küste Süd-brasiliens, 1887 - About a fur seal species from coastal southern Brazil.
 Ueber Sus celebensis und Verwandte, 1889 - On the Celebes warty pig and related animals.
 Ueber Tundren und Steppen der jetzt- und vorzeit, mit besonderer Berücksichtigung ihrer Fauna, 1890 - On tundra and steppes (past and present), with special reference to its fauna. 
 Die geographische Verbreitung der Säugetiere in dem Tschernosem-Gebiete des rechten Wolgaufers, sowie in den angrenzenden Gebieten, 1891 - Geographical distribution of mammals in the Chernozem regions on the right bank of the Volga, and adjacent areas.
 Neue Notizen über cervus megaceros var. Ruffii Nhrg und über das diluviale Torflager von Klinge bei Kottbus, 1892 - New information on Cervus megaceros, etc.
 Ueber Kreuzungen von Cavia aperea und Cavia cobaya, 1893 - On crossbreeding Cavia aperea and Cavia cobaya. 
 Ueber Herberstain und Hirsfogel; Beiträge zur kenntnis ihres lebens und ihrer werke, 1897 - On Herberstain and Hirsfogel: Contributions to the knowledge of their work. 
 Eine neue Nesokia-Species aus Palästina, 1898 - A new species of Nesokia in Palestine.
 Die Priorität des Genusnamens Cricetus. In: Zoologischer Anzeiger, 1900 - The priority of the genus name Cricetus.
 Die Schädel von Ctenomys minutus Nhrg., Ct. torquatus Licht. und Ct. Pundti Nhrg, 1900 - The skull of Ctenomys minutus, etc.
Nehring also made contributions to Reiss & Stübel's Das Totenfeld von Ancon in Peru (translated into English as "The necropolis of Ancon in Peru; a contribution to our knowledge of the culture and industries of the empire of the Incas", etc.)

References 
 Meyers Big Conversation Lexicon (biographical information)

19th-century German zoologists
German paleontologists
1904 deaths
1845 births
People from Northeim